Wings, legs and tails (translit. Krilya, nogi i khvosti) is a 1986 Soviet animation film by Alexander Tatarsky and Igor Kovalyov (Studio Ekran). The film is about a vulture who attempts to teach an ostrich to fly. The film is a fable for kids telling that everybody has his limitations and abilities.

External links 
 Wings, legs and tails at Animator.ru

Soviet animated films
Films directed by Igor Kovalyov